Alisa Childers (born Alisa Noelle Girard; April 17, 1975) is an American singer, songwriter, apologist and author. She is known for being in the all-female Christian music group ZOEgirl.

Career

Early years
Born Alisa Noelle Girard to Karen and Christian music pioneer, Chuck Girard of Love Song, she grew up in San Fernando Valley, California. She studied gymnastics and piano at a young age. At the age of 21, she moved to New York and ran a youth center in southeast Manhattan.

ZOEgirl

Childers left New York and moved back to California, where she was contacted by a family friend about starting a group upon return. After a few months, Childers agreed to pursue the idea. She was introduced to Kristin Swinford-Schweain and the two began composing songs. A few months later, Chrissy Conway-Katina joined the group. In 1999, ZOEgirl was signed to Sparrow Records. While with ZOEgirl, Childers wrote the singles "I Believe", "One Day", "Unchangeable", and "Scream".

Solo 
ZOEgirl stayed together for seven years. Their split was amicable. At the end of 2006, Childers started a solo career.

Author and apologist 
Childers has authored two books.

Her first, Another Gospel (Tyndale, 2020) recounts her experience with progressive Christianity and deconstruction. She attended what was portrayed as a Bible study, but what she concluded was an attempt to destroy her faith, and her journey back to the faith she once held.

Her second, Live Your Truth and Other Lies (Tyndale, 2022) continues in the same vein as her prior book, countering common phrases heard in the secular world.

Personal life
Alisa is married to Mike Childers, who played drums for ZOEgirl. On October 9, 2008 the couple had their first child together. Childers gave birth to a second child in 2011.

References

External links
 

1975 births
20th-century Christians
21st-century Christians
21st-century American singers
21st-century American women singers
American women singer-songwriters
American performers of Christian music
Christian music songwriters
Living people
Christian apologists
American Christian writers